Koço Kasapoğlu (15 November 1935 – 5 April 2016), also known as Yorgo or Kostas Kasapoğlu, was a Greek-Turkish football player and manager. He was also nicknamed penaltı kralı (in English Penalty King) because he scored 500 of the 501 penalties he took in his career and is considered the best penalty taker in Turkish football history.

Professional career
Kasapoğlu played for Beyoğluspor, İstanbul S.A.Ş. and Vefa SK, and was considered one of the most iconic captains of İstanbulspors history,

International career
He capped for Turkey for once on 25 November 1956 in Praha in a 1–1 tie against Czechoslovakia. He also played for Turkey B national football team.

Death
Kasapoğlu died on 5 April 2016, at the age of 80. He remained a lifelong fan of İstanbulspor A.Ş.

References

External links

1935 births
2016 deaths
Footballers from Istanbul
Turkish footballers
Turkey international footballers
Turkey B international footballers
Turkish people of Greek descent
Süper Lig players
TFF First League players
Beyoğlu SK footballers
İstanbulspor footballers
Taksim SK footballers
Vefa S.K. footballers
Association football forwards
Constantinopolitan Greeks
People from Princes' Islands